Ali Nagar Roda is a village located in central Punjab province of Pakistan. It is part of the Pir Mahal Tehsil of Toba Tek Singh District. There is a mosque and Imam Bargah in this village. It consists of more than hundred houses. Syed families are the ruling authority there.

This village has produced doctors and engineers who are working in renowned companies nationwide and in foreign countries. The village has a great culture and people living here love music and art. Some national singers are native to this countryside area.

You can check the geographical location from here Ali Nager Map

Populated places in Toba Tek Singh District